Fox Island is an uninhabited island in the Gulf of Saint Lawrence, Quebec. The island lies to the South of Harrington Harbour on Harrington Island.

References 

Coastal islands of Quebec